Ivano Fontana (25 November 1926 – 24 December 1993) was an Italian boxer.  He won a bronze medal in the middleweight division at the 1948 Summer Olympics in London, losing to gold medal winner Laszlo Papp. He was born in Lucca, Italy.

1948 Olympic record
 Round of 32: bye
 Round of 16: defeated John Nuttall (India) on points
 Quarterfinal: defeated Dogomar Martinez (Uruguay) on points
 Semifinal: lost to Laszlo Papp (Hungary) on points
 Bronze Medal Bout: won by walkover versus Mick McKeon (Ireland); was awarded bronze medal

Professional career
Fontana turned professional in 1950 and fought mainly in his native Italy. In 1952, he won the vacant Italian middleweight title with a win over Gino Campagna. In 1955, he won the Italian light heavyweight title with a win over Lorenzo Rocci.

References

External links
profile

1926 births
1993 deaths
Olympic boxers of Italy
Middleweight boxers
Boxers at the 1948 Summer Olympics
Olympic bronze medalists for Italy
Olympic medalists in boxing
Italian male boxers
Medalists at the 1948 Summer Olympics